Laurietta is a historic building in Fayette, Jefferson County, Mississippi.

Location
It is located off the Mississippi Highway 33 in Fayette, Mississippi.

Overview
It has been listed on the National Register of Historic Places since November 24, 1980.

References

Federal architecture in Mississippi
Houses on the National Register of Historic Places in Mississippi
Houses in Jefferson County, Mississippi
National Register of Historic Places in Jefferson County, Mississippi